The Nanking Provisional Government cabinet, also known as the Sun Yat-sen cabinet, was a temporary cabinet of the republican era of China. The first cabinet assembled following the formation of the Provisional Government on 1 January 1912, it was formed on 3 January 1912 and dissolved on 1 April the same year. It was the first and only cabinet led by Sun Yat-sen, the first provisional President of the Republic of China.

History 

On 1 January 1912, Sun Yat-sen, the leader of the Tongmenghui, was inaugurated as the first provisional President of the newly proclaimed Republic of China following the conclusion of the Xinhai Revolution. Two days later, representatives of all provincial leaders approved a list of ministerial heads to be appointed in the first cabinet. The absence of several cabinet members in Nanking (presently Nanjing) delayed the first cabinet meeting, which wasn't held until 21 January. The meeting was hosted by Sun.

On 13 March, Tang Shaoyi, the first Premier of the Republic of China, began the formation of a new cabinet at Peking (presently Beijing). On 1 April, Sun Yat-sen resigned from his position as provisional President. In his resignation letter, written two days after his resignation, Sun stated, "Today (3 April 1912), Premier Tang went southbound and visited me, all ministerial positions in the cabinet were confirmed, and the news has been reported to me at Nanking on 1 April. I hereby resign today (as President)......all cabinet ministers will remain and continue their duties until all new replacements are appointed." All ministers and their respective deputies in the cabinet were subsequently relieved of their duties once the new cabinet was formally appointed.

The Nanking Provisional Government was a presidential government under the leadership of a president. This system was abolished following Yuan Shikai's ascension to power whereby a parliamentary government was introduced in the form of the National Assembly led by a Premier. The changes were made to limit Yuan's presidential powers, making him a figurehead in the government.

Ministries
Prior to the formation of the Provisional Government in 1912, the revolutionaries had notified provincial representatives to form local general staffs to unify the military situation during the revolutions in 1911. However, when Sun Yat-sen became provisional President, none of the provincial representatives had arrived to meet him in time, thus when the General Staffs Office was founded on 6 February 1912, Sun appointed Huang Xing as its first chief of staff.

On 3 January 1912, the list of ministers of the first cabinet was approved by all provincial representatives in the new Republic. On 5 January, an inauguration ceremony of all cabinet ministers was hosted by provisional President Sun Yat-sen. Each ministries were founded on different dates after the inauguration of their respective ministers. Their date of founding is listed as such:

Composition

Overview

Full ministers 
Key of political parties or affiliations:
 (4)
 (2)
 (1)
 (3)

Deputy ministers 
Key of political parties or affiliations:
 (8)
 (2)

See also 

 Politics of the Republic of China
 Warlord Era

References

Citations

Bibliography 

 Academic books and journals
 

Provisional governments
Republic of China (1912–1949)